Kyiv National Ballet performs works of classical ballet and tours internationally. It currently has 24 ballets in its repertory, one of the largest in the world, and has had many notable dancers among its members.

History

1867 to 1930
The National Opera of Ukraine, a performing arts theatre with a resident opera company, was established in 1867. It also included a small resident troupe of ballet dancers, who would perform mainly folk-style dancing during opera productions. By 1893, this grew to a troupe large enough to stage large ballets. Folk dancing and ballets with Ukrainian stories were among the early productions.

During the 1910s, the dance scene in Kyiv saw a rapid development in classical ballet and contemporary dance training and performance. Mikhail Mordkin, a former soloist with the Bolshoi Ballet, travelled to Kyiv with a troupe and gave performances with Art Nouveau approaches, containing Spanish and Oriental themes. He was hired by the experimental Kyiv Young Theatre between 1916 and 1919, and gained a reputation as an influential teacher of movement and dance.

Bronislava Nijinska, sister of Vaslav Nijinsky and a former soloist with Diaghilev's Ballets Russes in Paris, fled to Kyiv in 1916 to escape World War I upheaval in Western Europe. Her husband, also a dancer with the Ballets Russes, was hired as ballet master at the Kyiv Opera. Nijinska founded a modernist dance school, the École de Mouvement, in Kyiv. This was an influential step forward in Kyiv's dance culture, exposing artists there to the avant garde of Western Europe. Following the Communist Revolution in Russia and Ukraine, however, Nijinska was forced to flee once more, to Poland, and the school disbanded shortly afterward. Her most prominent pupil while in Kyiv was local dancer Serge Lifar, who went on to become principal dancer with the Ballets Russes in 1923, and was considered the most important dancer and choreographer of his generation.

1931 to 1989
The first full symphonic Ukrainian ballet, Mr. Kanyovsky by M. Verikivsky, was premiered by the Kyiv Ballet on October 18, 1931. In 1935, the Kyiv Ballet was awarded the gold medal at the London International Folklore Dance Festival. Also known as the National Ballet of Ukraine, the Kyiv Ballet company began to tour internationally by the 1950s, primarily in Communist Bloc countries such as Bulgaria, Yugoslavia, and Hungary, but also to Britain and France. The Kyiv Ballet was awarded the Étoile d'Or the French Dance Academy's highest prize, at the 1964 International Dance Festival in Paris. Performances by the National Ballet of Ukraine in Paris were considered highlights of the European cultural calendar for many years.

1990 to today

Following Ukraine independence in 1990, the Kyiv Ballet began more extensive international touring, adding performances in North America, Europe and Asia to its tours.

Choreographer Anatoly Shekera directed the company from 1992 to 2000. Shekera was a driving force of the National Ballet during the late 20th century. Shekera directed modern and classical ballet works. The company currently has around 150 dancers, and stages 16 productions per month in its Kyiv theatre, in addition to extensive international touring. Some of the famous former members of the Kyiv Ballet are Alina Cojocaru, the Bolshoi's Svetlana Zakharova, Leonid Sarafanov, Maxim Beloserkovsky and his wife, Irina Dvorovenko. Other former members are Maya Plisetskaya, Nadezhda Pavlova, Marina Timofeyeva, Irina Kolpakova, Alla Osipenko, and Vladimir Malakhov.

Kyiv Ballet School
The Kyiv Choreographic College, formally Kyiv Choreographic School/Academy was founded by Galina Berezova. The school was founded in 1949 and is considered one of the best ballet schools in the post-Soviet space. It first opened in 1934 as a small studio to train ballet dancers for the Kyiv Opera and Ballet Theatre, where the legendary ballet teacher and influencer Agrippina Vaganova worked.

See also

 List of dance companies

References

Culture in Kyiv
Ballet in Ukraine
Ballet companies